The Macedonian diaspora consists of ethnic Macedonian emigrants and their descendants.

Macedonian diaspora may also refer to:

In ethnic terms
 Greek Macedonian diaspora, diaspora of ethnic Greeks from the region of Macedonia

In regional terms
 Macedonian regional diaspora, people of various ethnic backgrounds who originated from the region of Macedonia
 Diaspora of North Macedonia, people of various ethnic backgrounds who originated from North Macedonia

See also
 Macedonia (disambiguation)
 Macedonian (disambiguation)